Koji Aoyama (青山 浩二, born August 12, 1983) is a Japanese former professional baseball pitcher. He has played in his entire career with the Nippon Professional Baseball (NPB) for the Tohoku Rakuten Golden Eagles.

Career

On March 25, 2006, Aoyama made his NPB debut.

On November 21, 2020, Aoyama announced his retirement.

References

External links

NPB.com

1983 births
Living people
Baseball people from Hokkaido
Japanese baseball players
People from Hakodate
Nippon Professional Baseball pitchers
Tohoku Rakuten Golden Eagles players